Mancherial Assembly constituency is a constituency of Telangana Legislative Assembly, India. It is one of 3 constituencies in Mancherial district. It comes under Peddapalli Lok Sabha constituency along with 6 other Assembly constituencies.

Diwakar Rao Nadipelli of Telangana Rashtra Samithi is representing the constituency for the second time

Mandals
The Assembly Constituency presently comprises the following Mandals:

Members of Legislative Assembly Luxettipet

Members of Legislative Assembly Mancherial

Election results

Telangana Legislative Assembly election, 2018

Telangana Legislative Assembly election, 2014

Andhra Pradesh Legislative Assembly election, 2009

See also
 List of constituencies of Telangana Legislative Assembly

References

Assembly constituencies of Telangana
Mancherial district